The San Emigdio Mountains are a part of the Transverse Ranges in Southern California, extending from Interstate 5 at Lebec and Gorman on the east to Highway 33–166 on the west. They link the Tehachapis and Temblor Range and form the southern wall of the San Joaquin Valley. The range is named after Emygdius, an early Christian martyr.

Geography
The range is within Kern County. As with most of the Transverse Ranges, the mountains generally lie in an east-west direction.

Towns or settlements near the San Emigdio Mountains include Frazier Park, Lake of the Woods, and Pine Mountain Club.

Highest peaks
 San Emigdio Mountain 
 Tecuya Mountain 7,160+ ft (2,182+ m)
 Escapula Peak 7,080+ ft (2,158+ m)
 Brush Mountain 7,048 ft (2,148 m)
 Antimony Peak 6,848 ft (2,087 m)
 Eagle Rest Peak 6,005 ft (1,830 m)

Adjacent ranges
Adjacent Transverse Ranges, with their wildlife corridors, include:
 Tehachapi Mountains — on the northeast
 Sierra Pelona Mountains — on the east
 Pine Mountain Ridge - (to the south)
 Topatopa Mountains — on the southwest
 San Rafael Mountains - (to the west)
 Santa Ynez Mountains - (to the southwest)
 San Joaquin Valley — on the north
 Temblor Range - (''to the northwest)

See also
 Mountain Communities of the Tejon Pass
 Pyramid Lake
 Index: Transverse Ranges

References

External links
 The Wildlands Conservancy: Wind Wolves Preserve website

 
Mountain ranges of Southern California
Transverse Ranges
Mountain ranges of Kern County, California
Los Padres National Forest